The 1st Africa Movie Academy Awards ceremony was held on May 30, 2005 at the Gloryland Cultural Center in Yenagoa, Bayelsa State, Nigeria, to honor the best African films of 2004. The ceremony was broadcast live on Nigerian national television. Nollywood actress Stella Damasus-Aboderin and Nollywood actor Segun Arinze hosted the ceremony.

Winners

Major Awards 
The winners of the 14 Award Categories are listed first and highlighted in bold letters.

References

External links 
 AMAA Awards Show Reel 2013

Africa Movie Academy Awards
Africa Movie Academy Awards
Africa Movie Academy Awards ceremonies
Award
Africa Movie Academy Awards